Islam in South Ossetia is presented by migrants who work there, but not by the native Ossetians, unlike in North Ossetia - Alania, with the exception of the Ossetians of the Aul of Zebat in Erman, who are Muslims.

History 
Islam started to spread in Ossetia in the 14th and 15th centuries. According to sources, mostly high noble families of Ossetian society received Muslim religion and peasants remained into the Christian faith.

“In the 17th and 18th centuries, part of Ossetian people from Digor (under influence of Kabarday) received Islam religion.

Demographics 
Although there are no official censuses, estimates say that about 0.5% of the population of South Ossetia are Muslims. Officials also suspect that Russia's military and political actions will likely cause this percentage to increase.

References 

South Ossetia
Islam in Asia
Religion in South Ossetia